O Cafona is a 1971 Brazilian telenovela created by Bráulio Pedroso, starring Francisco Cuoco and Marília Pêra in the main roles.

Cast

References

External links

TV Globo telenovelas
1971 telenovelas
Brazilian telenovelas
1971 Brazilian television series debuts
1971 Brazilian television series endings
Portuguese-language telenovelas
Television shows set in Rio de Janeiro (city)